Trapezites argenteoornatus, the silver spotted skipper, is a butterfly of the family Hesperiidae. It is found in Western Australia.

The wingspan is about 30 mm.

The larvae feed on Acanthocarpus preissii, Acanthocarpus verticillatus, and Acanthocarpus robustus.

External links
 Australian Caterpillars

Trapezitinae
Butterflies described in 1868
Butterflies of Australia
Taxa named by William Chapman Hewitson